The Prince Street station is a local station on the BMT Broadway Line of the New York City Subway. Located in SoHo, Manhattan, it is served by the R train at all times except late nights, the W train on weekdays, the N train during late nights and weekends, and the Q train during late nights.

The station opened in 1917, had its platforms extended in the late 1960s, and was renovated in the late 1970s and in 2001.

History
Prince Street opened on September 4, 1917, as part of the first section of the BMT Broadway Line from Canal Street to 14th Street–Union Square.

The city government took over the BMT's operations on June 1, 1940. In the late 1960s, New York City Transit extended the platforms for 10 car trains, and fixed the station's structure and the overall appearance. The station was overhauled in the late 1970s. The original trim lines were replaced with white cinderblock tiles, except for small recesses in the walls, which contained yellow-painted cinderblock tiles. The staircases were repaired and new platform edges were installed. The yellow cinderblock field contained the station-name signs and black text pointing to the exits. The renovation also replaced incandescent lighting with fluorescent lighting.

In 2001, the station received a major overhaul. It included an upgrade of the station for ADA compliance and restoration of the original late 1910s tiling. New York City Transit repaired the staircases, re-tiled the walls, fitted new tiling on the floors, upgraded the station's lights and the public address system, installing ADA yellow safety threads along the platform edge, new signs, and new trackbeds in both directions.

Station layout

This underground station has two side platforms and four tracks, the inner two of which are express tracks that do not serve the station. South of Prince Street, there are diamond crossovers between both directional pairs of local and express tracks. A punch box is located at the south end of the southbound platform to allow weekend N and late-night Q trains to cross the Manhattan Bridge.

The 2004 artwork, Carrying On, is by Janet Zweig. It uses water jet-cut steel, marble, and slate to create a mural along the entire length (totaling 1,200 feet) of both platforms. The 194 different frames in this frieze detail contain images of New Yorkers from all walks of life. As the title suggests, almost all of the images involve carrying something.

Exits
Fare control for each platform is at platform level. There is no free transfer between directions. Outside of fare control, the northbound platform has one street stair to either eastern corner of Broadway and Prince Street, while the southbound platform has one street stair to either western corner of that intersection.

References

External links 

 
 Station Reporter — N Train
 Station Reporter — R Train
 MTA's Arts For Transit — Prince Street (BMT Broadway Line)
 Prince Street entrance from Google Maps Street View
 Lobby from Google Maps Street View
 Platforms from Google Maps Street View

BMT Broadway Line stations
Broadway (Manhattan)
New York City Subway stations in Manhattan
Railway stations in the United States opened in 1917
1917 establishments in New York City
SoHo, Manhattan